

Creation and conception
Multi was the second heroine in To Heart to be created by writer Tatsuya Takahashi and illustrator Tōru Minazuki, after the pair had created Aoi Matsubara. Takahashi recalled that he thought the development team would react surprised when he declared he would make one of the heroines a robot, but he instead received calm responses. Minazuki held no objections because he thought a robot character would allow the pair more creative freedom, and thought Multi's innocent personality would be fitting for a robot character. Takahashi also stated that as a robot, Multi in turn made the magus Serika Kurusugawa and esper Kotone Himekawa acceptable characters for the story. In an interview, Takahashi noted that he initially had difficulty creating contrast between Multi's, Aoi's, and Akari Kamigishi's personalities, but said their personalities eventually diverged, and Multi ended up as having an "earnestly pure" personality.

Appearances

Visual novel
In the visual novel, Multi is first mentioned in a conversation among Shiho Nagaoka, Masashi Satō, and Hiroyuki Fujita, when the three discuss the school's recent admittance of a maid robot. Hiroyuki later meets Multi, when he saves her from falling down the stairs. Hiroyuki then learns that Multi is a prototype robot undergoing a test run at the school, and the two soon become friends. Throughout the next week, Hiroyuki regularly chats with Multi as she cleans the school's corridors, and often helps her when she becomes troubled by an unfamiliar situation.

After Multi finishes her eight-day testing period, she asks Hiroyuki to give her the chance to repay the favor; she is taken by Hiroyuki to an amusement park for a date. While the couple rides the park's ferris wheel attraction, Multi reveals that her memories will be reset after the testing period is over, and that the data she gathered during the test run will be reused in the mass-produced model. Multi confesses her love to Hiroyuki, and willingly returns to her laboratory after Hiroyuki buys her a straw hat and promises her to purchase a mass-produced model. Later, Hiroyuki meets Gengorō Nagase, Multi's designer, who discusses his opinions about robots with Hiroyuki.

The following year, Hiroyuki and Akari begins to attend university. Remembering his promise with Multi, Hiroyuki buys a mass-produced variant of Multi, but finds that Multi's emotional functionality has been removed as a result of cost reduction. Hiroyuki eventually receives a letter from Nagase, who informs him that the Multi he bought had been used as a test model in his high school. Hiroyuki also receives Multi's straw hat and a DVD that contains her previous data, which Hiroyuki uses to recover Multi's memories. Multi wakes up with her memories and emotions intact, and reaffirms her love to Hiroyuki.

Other To Heart media
Multi has appeared in other media adaptations of To Heart. In the first manga series by Ukyō Takao, Multi first appears in the second chapter, which mainly focuses on her story in the visual novel. The manga chapter centers on Multi's test run, and provides an alternative outcome in which Multi remains enrolled in school with the help of Serika Kurusugawa; Multi appears as a recurring character in the manga's subsequent chapters. She also appears in the Masanori Date's light novel adaptation as the story's main character.

In 1999, the animation studio OLM created the first To Heart anime adaptation with character design by Yuriko Chiba. The anime devotes two episodes to Multi's story arc. In the series, Multi remains in school after her evaluation due to unsatisfactory results. In the second anime series To Heart: Remember My Memories, which featured character design by Madoka Hirayama, and its manga adaptation by Takao, Multi is the story's main focus along with Akari Kamigishi.

Other appearances
Multi has also appeared in other titles not directly related to To Heart. In the first anime adaptation of Comic Party, another of Leaf's and Aquaplus' titles, she makes a cameo appearance as one of the To Heart characters who appear in Kazuki Sendō's dream in the first episode. Her likeness is also used in later episodes as fan art in dōjinshi and cosplay costumes. Multi appears as the main heroine in Aquaplus' freeware title  for their P/ECE handheld console. Multi is a playable character in Aquaplus' arcade fighting game, Aquapazza: Aquaplus Dream Match. She also makes a cameo appearance in Reimu's ending in the third Touhou Project game, Phantasmagoria of Dim. Dream.

Cultural impact
Multi has garnered generally positive reception. Holly Ellingwood of ActiveAnime praised the character as "one of the cutest characters in the anime and she certainly livens things up at the school," and both Carlo Santos of Anime News Network and Kevin Gifford of Newtype USA considered the character the most popular character in the series. Santos further described the character "one of the founding principles of moe," and Gifford credited the character's appearance in To Heart "for introducing that ultimate stereotype...the maid-robot character." In the book Otaku: Japan's Database Animals, literary critic Hiroki Azuma also considered Multi to be the "most influential character among the male otaku" after Neon Genesis Evangelion.

The inclusion of Multi in the anime received mixed responses. In her review for the third volume, Ellingwood described Multi's first episode in the anime as "really [stepping] out of the norm so far by giving the anime the sci-fi addition of a girl robot." Santos praised Multi's second episode as "the most poignant one in the series". He added that "there's a lot of sentimental cheese on display...but the fact is, Multi's abrupt dismissal gives reason enough for a thoughtful pause."

In contrast, reviewer John Sinnott of the DVD Talk website criticized Multi as unfitting for the series. He complained that the "whole section seemed like filler," and commented that the subplot "could have been interesting and fun, but it just sort of went no where." Mania.com's Chris Beveridge said in his review for the anime that "Multi's presence takes you out of the series in a way that other characters...don't." He felt that the character "obviously [has] a heartwarming element", but thought the character "feels very out of place in the framework the show has built itself on."

References

Bibliography

 
 
 
 
 
 

Female characters in anime and manga
Female characters in video games
ToHeart
Robot characters in video games
Video game characters introduced in 1997